is a 2015 Japanese streaming television drama developed by Fuji Television for Netflix. It is a coming of age drama set in a small high-class lingerie design house called Emotion, which is based in Tokyo's Ginza district. The drama centres around Mayuko Tokita, a new employee, and her struggle to find her place at Emotion.

Central to that struggle is her relationship with Mayumi Nanjo the creator and owner of Emotion, who has been compared to Anna Wintour, an editor of American Vogue.

Cast and characters 
The main cast includes:
Mirei Kiritani as  a "fabric geek" who joins Emotion in the first episode.
She eschews mass production in favour of one-off and limited production.
She originally left Emotion to start her own brand but later returns to the company. 
Cool on the outside, he joined Emotion because he was passionate about the way Nanjo did business.
Maiko as Fumika Iida, a senior lingerie designer at Emotion, who leaves the company to join one of their competitors.
He later resigns from Emotion to save the company from bankruptcy and pursue his own career.
Later in the series, Machida finds success as a supermodel.
Toshi Takeuchi as Naomichi Kaji, a young man who later joined Emotion as a part-timer. He develops a crush on Mayuko.
Hisahiro Ogura as Mr. Yamazaki, the manager of Shikishima Coffee, where Mayuko and Yuri occasionally hang out. He and Nanjo knew each other back in high school.
Megumi Sato as Rin Nakatani, a manager of a Carolina Herrera store who does some business with Emotion.

Episodes

References

External links 
 
  
 

Japanese-language Netflix original programming
Japanese drama television series
Films with screenplays by Naoko Adachi
2015 Japanese television series debuts
2015 Japanese television series endings
Fuji TV dramas